Harpalus dimidiatus is a species of ground beetle in the subfamily Harpalinae. It was described by P. Rossi in 1790.

References

dimidiatus
Beetles described in 1790